The Nobel Prizes are five separate prizes that, according to Alfred Nobel's will of 1895, are awarded to "those who, during the preceding year, have conferred the greatest benefit to humankind." In 1968, a sixth prize, the Nobel Memorial Prize in Economic Sciences, was established.

Hungarians have won 13 Nobel Prizes since 1905. Following is a complete list of the Nobel laureates of Hungary, as recognised by the Hungarian Academy of Sciences.

Laureates
Hungarians have received Nobel Prizes in Physics, Chemistry, Physiology or Medicine, Literature, and Economics – in all fields except Peace.

Also included sometimes

Born in Hungary
Leopold Ružička, born in the Kingdom of Hungary, ethnic Croat
Isidor Isaac Rabi, born in Austrian part of  Austria-Hungary, Polish-Jewish
Ivo Andrić, born in Austria-Hungary, ethnic Croat
Vladimir Prelog, born in Austria-Hungary, ethnic Croat

Born abroad
Elie Wiesel, Hungarian-Jewish, born in Sighet, Kingdom of Romania
Daniel Carleton Gajdusek, parents from the Kingdom of Hungary, father ethnic Slovak from Büdöskő, mother ethnic Hungarian from Debrecen
Milton Friedman, Hungarian-Jewish parents, from Beregszász, Kingdom of Hungary
Louise Glück,Hungarian-Jewish father (parents from Érmihályfalva, Kingdom of Hungary)
George Stigler, mother ethnic Hungarian from the Kingdom of Hungary
Hugh David Politzer, Hungarian-Jewish, father from Pozsony, Kingdom of Hungary
Mother appears to be hungarian to  since there are a lot of hungarian names in her family.
Tamar Diamant

Nominees

See also
Friedrich Hayek, Austrian,  grandfather from Arad, Kingdom of HungaryJosef Juraschek married magyar Elisabeth Bartha (born ca 1738)
Christian Zembsch was born 1707 in Eger, Kingdom of Hungary.
Erwin Schrödinger, grandfather from Mosonmagyaróvár, Kingdom of Hungary
Robert F. Furchgott, US-born,  Hungarian-Jewish, grandfather from Sarlóska, Kingdom of Hungary, grandmother from Nyitra, Kingdom of Hungary
Herta Müller, ethnic German, grandparents born in the Kingdom of Hungary
Stefan Hell, ethnic German, grandparents born in the Kingdom of Hungary
Carl Ferdinand Cori Austrian, hungarian ancestry on mothers side: Grandfather: Lippich(/Kastenholz Honorius Vilmos[hu]13 juni 1799  in Igló, Szepes county (now Spišská Nová Ves, Slovakia)  (Who married Terézia Zsitkovszky)
Osheroff US-born, Mothers father (Ondo) lutheran priest from what is now Slovakia, then Felvidék, Upper Hungary ca 895-1920.
David Gross, US-born, father had ancestry from Hungary/Czechoslovakia

References

Hungarian Nobel laureates
Lists of Hungarian people
Hungarian